Dimitri Boylan is the CEO of Avature, a Web 2.0 Human Capital Management software company.

Early life and education

Dimitri was born in Ohio to Irish immigrant parents.  His father was an electrician from Cavan and his mother was a nurse from county Cork, Ireland.  He was raised in New York City and graduated from Forest Hills High School (New York). He has a B.A. in biophysics from the University of Pennsylvania. He did postgraduate research in X-ray crystallography at the University of Illinois at Urbana-Champaign and published two papers, Large scale fluctuations of tropomyosin in the crystal in 1984 and  Motions of tropomyosin: characterization of anisotropic motions and coupled displacements in crystals in 1986.

Career

Prior to Avature, Dimitri Boylan co-founded and was the COO and later CEO of Hotjobs.com. HotJobs.com was a New York-based Internet Services company and one of the most successful Internet companies to emerge from the late '90s' dot com era.  HotJobs went public on the NASDAQ in 1999, became profitable in 2001 and was sold to Yahoo! in 2002, while many other first generation dot coms were collapsing. HotJobs's Enterprise software product, built on the Netscape browser, won the Comdex award for Best Network Product in 1998. 

Dimitri is a noted authority on the labor market and has appeared on CNN, Fox News, The Fox News’ Cavuto Report, and CNBC Power Lunch, and has been featured in The New York Times, Business Week, Business Reporter, The New York Daily News, Investor’s Business Daily, and other print publications. He served on the Board of Directors of Beijing-based Internet company Zhaopin.com, a leading Chinese employment site for six years. Zhaopin went public on the NYSE in 2014. In 2004 Dimitri founded Avature.

References

University of Pennsylvania alumni
Businesspeople in software
Living people
1960 births
American technology chief executives
American chief operating officers